Brunswick High School (BHS) is a public high school located in Lawrenceville, Virginia community in Brunswick County, Virginia. It is part of the Brunswick County Public Schools and opened in 1976.  Athletic teams compete in the Virginia High School League's AA Southside District in Region I. According to U.S. News, Brunswick High School's student body makeup is 51 percent male and 49 percent female, and the total minority enrollment is 80 percent. Brunswick High is the only high school in the Brunswick Co Public Schools.

Enrollment History

External links
 Brunswick High School

References 

Schools in Brunswick County, Virginia
Public high schools in Virginia
Educational institutions established in 1976
1976 establishments in Virginia